The Jordan Company (TJC) is a private equity firm focused on leveraged buyout and management buyout investments in smaller middle-market companies across a range of industries.

The firm, which is based in New York City, was founded in 1982.  The Jordan Company was founded by John W. Jordan II, prior to which he spent nine years at Carl Marks & Co., a merchant banking firm.

Since its founding, the firm has completed over 90 investments and raised approximately $6 billion of investor commitments across its two Jordan Resolute funds and older pledge vehicles.  Jordan's 2002 fund raised $1.5 billion of commitments and its second fund in 2007 raised $3.6 billion of capital.

Among the dozens of current and prior investments completed by TJC are the following: American Safety Razor Company, Bojangles' Famous Chicken 'n Biscuits (in conjunction with Durational Capital Management), Carmike Cinemas, Fannie May, Great American Cookie, Harvey Gulf, Lepage's Industries, Lincoln Industrial Corporation, Newflo Corporation, RockShox, Rockwood Industries, TAL International Group, Universal Technical Institute and Vivid Imaginations.

In 2018, the company raised $3.63 billion for its fourth fund, according to a filing with the Securities and Exchange Commission. In 2020, TJC joined Diligent Corporation's Modern Leadership Initiative and pledged to create five new board roles among its portfolio companies for racially diverse candidates.

In May 2021, the company purchased a majority share of engineered plastics manufacturer Spartech from Nautic Partners for an undisclosed amount.

References

External links
The Jordan Company (company website)

Private equity firms of the United States
Financial services companies established in 1982
1982 establishments in New York (state)